Pavel Parák (16 July 1913 – 30 September 1996) was a Czech rower. He competed in the men's eight event at the 1936 Summer Olympics.

References

1913 births
1996 deaths
Czech male rowers
Olympic rowers of Czechoslovakia
Rowers at the 1936 Summer Olympics
Place of birth missing